"One Precious Love" is a song recorded by Canadian country music group Prairie Oyster. It was released in December 1991 as the second single from their third studio album, Everybody Knows. It peaked at number 8 on the RPM Country Tracks chart in March 1992.

Chart performance

Year-end charts

References

1991 singles
Prairie Oyster songs
RCA Records singles
Song recordings produced by Josh Leo
1991 songs
Songs written by Joan Besen